Ypsolopha albiramella is a moth of the family Ypsolophidae. It is known from Italy, Croatia, Albania, North Macedonia, Greece, Crete and Turkmenistan.

The larvae have been recorded feeding on Ephedra distachya.

References

External links
lepiforum.de

Ypsolophidae
Moths of Europe
Moths of Asia